Kottagom is a village located near Marthandam, Kanyakumari District, Tamil Nadu, India.
The village is home to more than 300 families. The main three family names are Mutakuzhi Vilai, Melan Vilai, and Pitchan Vilai.

Temples

 Kottagom Kavu Temple (Dharma Sasta Temple)
 Sree Krishna Temple
 Mutakuzhi Bathreswari–Durga Amman Temple
 Batra Kali Amman Temple

Organisation

 Helping Minds Genial Charity Trust
 Viyasar Ilaignar Narpani Mantam
 Young Star Sports Club

Dharma Sasta Temple:

This is the oldest temple in this place. It has some important historic events.

Sree Krishnan Temple:

This the village temple. All the village people gather together for the annual function which is held in the month of December–January

Mutakuzhi Bathreswari–Durga Amman Temple:

This is the family temple of Mutakuzhi family.

Batra Kali Amman Temple:

This is the family temple of Pitichan Vilai Family.

Villages in Kanyakumari district